The Lake Patzcuaro salamander, locally known as achoque (Ambystoma dumerilii) is a neotenic salamander species.

This salamander is found in Lake Pátzcuaro, a high-altitude lake in the Mexican state of Michoacán. This is located in the Mesa Central region of the country, home to many isolated Ambystoma species.

There have been claims that a subspecies is found further inland to the north-east in San Juan del Río, Querétaro, but this is doubtful due to the animal's wholly aquatic nature.

Dumerilii retain their larval characteristics throughout their entire life. This results in adults that have long, heavily filamented external gills, gill slits lined with tooth-like gill rakers, and caudal fins.

Patzcuaro salamanders are usually yellowish in color, with a lighter shade on their underbellies. They have large heads and reduced limbs. They are opportunistic suction feeders, and eat many types of invertebrates.

Recently, this salamander has been used in research as a counterpoint to the more common captive-bred axolotl. Patzcuaro salamanders have been hybridized with axolotls, and used in mitochondrial studies for comparison.

Due to habitat destruction, pollution and the introduction of predatory fish the population has decreased severely in the past decades. It is listed as Critically endangered in the IUCN red list and in Appendix II CITES. There may be fewer than 100 individuals in the wild.

Conservation
Experts from Chester Zoo and Michoacan University have partnered with the Sisters of the Monastery of the Dominican Order in Pátzcuaro to breed the endangered salamander. The sisters have sustainably raised achoques for use in traditional medicine for 150 years. The breeding facility at the convent has two tanks for up to 400 salamanders. The achoques are measured, microchipped and paired for breeding by the sisters.

Chester Zoo and Michoacan University have populations of achoques, nonetheless, the population at the convent is the most viable since it is closest to the achoque's native habitat and the salamanders are thus less likely to be exposed to foreign pathogens. Trial releases of achoques may begin in 2020.

See also
Axolotl
 Decline in amphibian populations

References

Further reading
  Database entry includes a range map and justification for why this species is critically endangered

Mole salamanders
Amphibians described in 1870
Endemic amphibians of Mexico
Fauna of the Trans-Mexican Volcanic Belt
Critically endangered biota of Mexico
Critically endangered fauna of North America
Natural history of Michoacán
Taxa named by Alfredo Dugès